Giannis Kontoes (born 24 May 1986), nicknamed The Tiger, is a Greek former professional footballer who played as a defender. Currently working as an assistant coach.

Kontoes is known for his technical ability, solid defending, pace and constant overlapping runs. Kontoes also got the most assists for Panionios in the season 2010–11. Kontoes was listed as best left back in the starting 11 by Super League Greece due to his consistent performances.

Career

Panionios
When Panionios signed him, everybody in the club trusted him and he was ready to improve himself in order to meet the expectations of Panionios. He was rewarded for his efforts as Panionios fans loved him and his passion. So, the club decided to renew his contract with Kontoes. He was teammate with Grigoris Makos. Some years later, both of them played for AEK Athens.

AEK Athens
On 1 August 2011, Kontoes signed a three-year deal with AEK Athens on a free transfer keeping him at the club until 2014. Kontoes was a key target for AEK Athens as he is a versatile player who can play as right back, left back and centre back. He also had a very impressive season at Panionios and was named Panionios player of the year and MVP Left back in the Superleague Greece. Just before signing with AEK Athens, Panionios tried one last attempt on keeping Kontoes at Panionios and offered a higher contract than AEK Athens, however Kontoes declined the offer and signed with AEK Athens as he wanted to play in European competitions and contend for the Superleague Greece. Kontoes made his debut for AEK Athens in a 1-0 away win against Skoda Xanthi. Kontoes' second match of the season was against his former club Panionios where he received a lot of criticism from the fans as he left the club after 4 years and joined Athens rivals, AEK. Despite the criticism, Kontoes played a very solid game and was awarded the MVP award, the final score was a 1-0 away win for AEK Athens.

Kontoes became quickly very important for his team and for 2012-13 season he is expected to be one of the leaders in the "yellow-black" squad. He played mainly as a left back, but also and as a center back. In December 2012, Kontoes decided to "break" his contract with AEK Athens due to financial reasons.

Asteras Tripolis
On 30 January 2013, Kontoes signed a deal with Asteras Tripolis. On 24 February 2013, he made his debut with the club in a 1-0 home win against Levadiakos.

Atromitos
On 4 September 2014 Kontoes signed a deal with Atromitos, replacing Kostas Giannoulis who moved to Olympiakos. On 14 September, he made his debut with the club in a 0-0 home draw against Panetolikos. On 19 June 2015, he extended his contract with the club by two years for an undisclosed fee. On 17 May 2017, he solved his contract with Atromitos after 3 consecutive years with the club.

Apollon Smyrnis
On 29 June 2017 Apollon Smyrnis announced the signing of Kontoes. On 5 February 2018, he scored his first goal in his professional career in a 1-1 away draw game against Platanias.

Academica Clinceni
On 31 January 2020, Romanian club Academica Clinceni announced the signing of Kontoes on loan from CFR Cluj, until the end of the 2019-20 season. The 33-year-old defender was signed a contract with Cluj for the 2019-20 season, but did not play in any official game during the first half of the season.

References

External links
 
 Guardian Football 

1986 births
Living people
Footballers from Athens
Greek footballers
Association football defenders
Gamma Ethniki players
Delta Ethniki players
Super League Greece players
Liga I players
Agios Dimitrios F.C. players
Athinaikos F.C. players
Fostiras F.C. players
Panionios F.C. players
AEK Athens F.C. players
Asteras Tripolis F.C. players
Atromitos F.C. players
Apollon Smyrnis F.C. players
LPS HD Clinceni players
Greek expatriate footballers
Expatriate footballers in Romania
Greek expatriate sportspeople in Romania